Miss Asia Pacific International 2005, formerly titled Miss Asia Pacific Quest in 2003, the 36th Miss Asia Pacific International pageant, was held on 9 April 2005 at Guangzhou, China where 51 candidates competed for the title. Tatyana Nikita of Russia crowned her successor Leonora Jiménez of Costa Rica at the end of the contest. 

Not long after winning the crown, Jiménez was resigned in order to compete at another rival pageant which is Miss World. The first runner-up Yevgeniya Lapova of Russia replaced her as the winner. The runners-up moved up one position which then makes Jedah Hernandez of the Philippines became third runner-up.

Results

Special Awards

Order Of Announcements

Top 5

Candidates
  – Vida Samadzai
  – Vilma Masha
  – Laura Constanza Romero
  – Laura Frances Weston
  – Leslia Miller
  – Gloria Mariana Limpias
  – Natalia Souza Araujo
  – Katya Petrova
  – April Angeline Simone Mullings
  – Adriana Margot Barrientos
  – Zhang Li Ru
  – Vivian Vanessa Gomez
  – Leonora Jiménez
  – Masja Juel
  – Nessie Desiree Anaya
  – Alison Brennan
  – Amleset Muchie
  – Anna Dantchenko Karagiannopoulou
  – Channa Cius
  – Leslie Gabriela Molina
  – Diana Maloveczky
  – Simran Chandhok
  – Juel Daisi Pollard
  – Juel Daisi Pollard
  – Rita Lahoud
  – Wong Hui-Yin
  – Sarah Gurung
  –  Aurore Tissot
  – Kylie Anderson
  – Awa Dicko
  – Giselle Marie Bissot
  – Paloma Maria Navarro
  – Claudia Ortiz de Zevallos Cano
  – Jedah Casabuela Hernandez
  – Urszula Rozniecka
  – Yevgeniya Lapova
  – Megan Elizabeth Johnson
  – Colleen Francisca Pereira
  – Olivia Laniova
  – Jenilee Peters
 – Choi Young-ah
  – Kapuruge Tehani Renata Perera
  – Florina Weisz
  – Anne Maite Morou
  – Weng Hui-Chun
  – Suthida Deesri
  – Buket Koroglu
  – Raquel Roxanne Beezley
  – Marilyn Ferreira Pascual
  – Ngo Thi Mai Trang
  – Laura Jane Livesey

Notes 

 No semi-finalists were selected during the final night but all the delegates had the chance to participate in both Swimsuit and Evening Gown competition.

References

External links
Official website

2005 beauty pageants
2005